A squeeze bore, alternatively taper-bore, cone barrel or conical barrel, is a weapon where the internal barrel diameter progressively decreases towards the muzzle resulting in a reduced final internal diameter. These weapons are used in conjunction with special sub-caliber ammunition where the projectile is fitted with soft-metal flanges which fills out the caliber. As the projectile travels through the squeeze bore the flanges fold inwards, resulting in a reduced caliber round with an increased velocity compared to a traditional full-caliber round.

Mechanism

A squeeze bore utilizes the energy of the propellant to squeeze the diameter of the bullet or shell down, increasing penetration and velocity significantly.  This process also meant high chamber pressure and low barrel service life.  For example, the service life of a squeeze bore 7.5 cm Pak 41 could be as low as 1000 rounds compared to 5000-7000 rounds for the 7.5 cm Pak 39 (L/48).  The diameter of a fired shell could decrease as much as 40% from .50 caliber to .30 caliber (M2 machine gun).  Rather than squeezing solid shot, this is accomplished through a hardened penetrator core (tungsten for example) and a softer outer jacket (aluminium alloy) forming flanges or wings.  This outer jacket was crushed as the projectile left the barrel.

The squeeze bore concept typically was used in anti-tank guns before the widespread use of shaped charges.  Later, the perfection of discarding sabot ammo, which is based on the same concept of using a larger caliber barrel to fire a smaller caliber projectile at high-speed, negated the need for the squeeze bore concept.

History and usage

The squeeze bore concept was first patented by German Karl Puff in 1903, even though the general principle was known already in 19th century and used in Armstrong guns.  Later, Hermann Gerlich in the 1920s and 1930s experimented with the concept resulting in an experimental 7cm anti-tank rifle with a 1,800 m/s muzzle velocity.  This led to the squeeze bore concept sometimes being called the "Gerlich principle."

Between 1939-40, Mauser-Werk AG produced the 2.8 cm sPzB 41 and Krupp (in 1941) produced the 7.5 cm Pak 41.  These were eventually discontinued due to the lack of tungsten and  manufacturing  complexity for the ammunition.

Other uses of the squeeze bore include the British Littlejohn adaptor, a QF 6-pounder adapter and the M2 machine gun.  Squeezing down from 40mm to 30mm, 57mm to 42.6mm, and .50 caliber to .30 caliber respectively.  The Littlejohn adapter was used to extend the service life of the QF 2 pounder and was designed by František Janeček whose anglicized name gave the Littlejohn its designation.  The QF 6 pounder adapter was never adopted.

Gallery

See also
Choke (firearms)
Squeeze bore artillery
2.8 cm sPzB 41
4.2 cm Pak 41
7.5 cm Pak 41

References

Artillery components
Firearm components